The Kupa or Kolpa ( or ; from  in Roman times) river, a right tributary of the Sava, forms a natural border between north-west Croatia and southeast Slovenia.

Name
The name Colapis, recorded in antiquity, is presumed to come from the Proto-Indo-European roots *quel- 'turn, meander' and *ap- 'water', meaning 'meandering water'. An alternative interpretation is *(s)kel-/*skul- 'shiny, bright', meaning 'clear river'.

Course

The Kupa originates in Croatia in the mountainous region of Gorski Kotar, northeast of Rijeka, in the area of Risnjak National Park. It flows a few kilometers eastwards, receives the small Čabranka River from the left, before reaching the Slovenian border.

It then continues eastwards between the White Carniola region in the north and Central Croatia in the south. The Kupa receives influx from the river Lahinja from the left in Primostek, passes Vrbovsko, and eventually detaches from the Slovenian border having passed Metlika. 

It then reaches the city of Karlovac, where it receives influx from two other rivers from the right, Dobra and Korana (which in turn is joined by Mrežnica). The Kupa continues flowing to the east, where it merges with Glina from the right, it then passes through two small towns called Šišinec and Brkiševina, and then proceeds to the town of Sisak where it merges with Odra from the left and, after passing through Sisak town centre, flows into the Sava River.

Pollution
Fairly unpolluted downstream to Karlovac, the upper Kupa is a popular place for bathing in summer. The section from Stari Trg down to Fučkovci since 2006 is part of the Slovenian Krajinski park Kolpa nature reserve.

The hydrological parameters of the Kupa are regularly monitored at Radenci, Kamanje, Karlovac, Jamnička Kiselica and Farkašić.

See also
Slovenian border barrier

References

Sources

Further reading

External links

source of Kupa pictures
Panoramic of the source
Awarded "EDEN - European Destinations of Excellence" non traditional tourist destination 2010

 
 
Rivers of Croatia
Rivers of White Carniola
International rivers of Europe
Croatia–Slovenia border
Border rivers
Natura 2000 in Slovenia
Landforms of Karlovac County